Charles Grosvenor is a film director.

Charles Grosvenor may also refer to:

Charles H. Grosvenor, US Representative
Charles R. Grosvenor Jr, creator of Am I Right